The 1MV planetary probe (short for 1st generation Mars-Venus) is a designation for a common design used by early Soviet uncrewed probes to Mars and Venus. It was standard practice of the Soviet space program to use standardized components as much as possible. All probes shared the same general characteristics and differed only in equipment necessary for specific missions. Each probe also incorporated improvements based on experience with earlier missions.
It was superseded by the 2MV family.

Variants
Mars 1M: Mars probe 1M No.1 (failure), Mars probe 1M No.2 (failure)
Venera 1VA: Sputnik 7 (1VA No.1), Venera 1 (1VA No.2, Sputnik 8)

See also 
 Soviet space program
 Venera
 2MV

References 

 
Soviet Mars missions
Soviet Venus missions
Soviet space probes